John Wesley Snyder House is a historic home located near Winston-Salem, Forsyth County, North Carolina.  It was completed about 1922, and is a large two-story, three bay, American Craftsman style granite dwelling. It features a low hipped roof pierced by three low hipped dormers, widely overhanging eaves, carved rafter ends, and projecting entrance bay supported by a pair of extraordinarily dramatic, large, curved, wood brackets. It has a Colonial Revival / Craftsman interior. Construction materials were sourced from local quarries and forests. Also on the property are the contributing two-story granite carriage house/apartment (c.1922), granite smokehouse (c.1940), frame barn (c.1922), and frame pack house (c.1950).

It was listed on the National Register of Historic Places in 2000.

References

Houses on the National Register of Historic Places in North Carolina
Colonial Revival architecture in North Carolina
Houses completed in 1922
Houses in Winston-Salem, North Carolina
National Register of Historic Places in Winston-Salem, North Carolina